The North Carolina Law Review is the law journal of the University of North Carolina School of Law. It was established in 1922 and is published in six issues each year. As of 2017, the North Carolina Law Review was ranked #30 among US law journals. The North Carolina Law Review also publishes an online supplement the North Carolina Law Review Forum.

References

External links 
 

American law journals
General law journals
University of North Carolina at Chapel Hill publications
Publications established in 1922
English-language journals
Bimonthly journals